A cantonment (or ) is a military quarters. In Bangladesh, India, Pakistan and other parts of South Asia, a cantonment refers to a permanent military station (a term from the colonial-era). In United States military parlance, a cantonment is, essentially, "a permanent residential section (i.e. barrack) of a fort or other military installation," such as Fort Hood.

The word cantonment, derived from the French word canton, meaning corner or district, refers to a temporary military or winter encampment. For example, at the start of the Waterloo campaign in 1815, while the Duke of Wellington's headquarters were in Brussels, most of his Anglo–allied army of 93,000 soldiers were cantoned, or stationed, to the south of Brussels.

List of permanent cantonments

Afghanistan

The former Sherpur Cantonment in Kabul, Afghanistan, which was the site of the Siege of the Sherpur Cantonment (1879) in the Second Anglo-Afghan War (1878–1880), is now maintained as a British Army cemetery.

Bangladesh
In Bangladesh, cantonments are residential quarters for many military personnel aside from soldiers. These individuals include officers, teachers, military doctors, military nurses, junior commanding officers, and non–commissioned Officers. A wide variety of military training is provided in  Bangladesh cantonments:

Alikadam Cantonment, Bandarban
Bandarban Cantonment, Bandarban
Bangladesh Military Academy, Chittagong
Chittagong Cantonment, Chittagong
Comilla Cantonment, Comilla
Dhaka Cantonment, Dhaka
Dighinala Cantonment, Khagrachari
Halishahar Cantonment, Chittagong
Jahanabad Cantonment, Khulna
Jahangirabad Cantonment, Bogra
Jalalabad Cantonment, Sylhet
Jamuna Cantonment, Tangail
Jessore Cantonment, Jessore
Kaptai Cantonment, Kaptai
Khagrachari Cantonment, Khagrachari
Kholahati Cantonment, Dinajpur
Majhira Cantonment, Bogra
Mawa Cantonment, Louhajong, Munshigonj
Mirpur Cantonment, Dhaka
Mymensingh Cantonment, Mymensingh
Padma Cantonment, Shariatpur
Postogola Cantonment, Dhaka
Qadirabad Cantonment, Natore
Rajendrapur Cantonment, Gazipur
Rajshahi Cantonment, Rajshahi
Ramu Cantonment, Cox's Bazar
Rangamati Cantonment, Rangamati
Rangpur Cantonment, Rangpur
Saidpur Cantonment, Nilphamari
Savar Cantonment, Dhaka
Shahid Salahuddin Cantonment, Ghatail
Sheikh Hasina Cantonment, Lebukhali, Barisal-Patuakhali

Bhutan
The Indian Army maintains a training mission in Bhutan, known as the Indian Military Training Team (IMTRAT) which is responsible for the military training of the Royal Bhutan Army (RBA) and Royal Bodyguard (RBG) personnel. All RBA and RBG officers are sent for training at the National Defence Academy and the Indian Military Academy. Moreover, Project Dantak, a division of the Indian Border Roads Organisation and subdivision of the Indian Army Corps of Engineers, was established in Bhutan on 24 April 1961, with its first commanding officer, Colonel TV Jaganathan. These serve India's strategic defence needs, but also provide economic benefits for the Bhutani citizens.

India
Several cities among the Indian subcontinent, such as Ahmedabad, Ambala, Bellary, Belgaum, Bangalore, Danapur, Jabalpur, Kanpur, Bathinda, Delhi, Meerut, Pune, Ramgarh, Secunderabad, and Trichy, contained large cantonments of the former British Indian Army, with Meerut and Ramgarh being two of the most important cantonments in northern India, second only to the headquarters at Rawalpindi (now in Pakistan). Meerut was established in 1803 and for 150 years was the largest cantonment in the region. Although cantonments in India were considered to be semi-permanent in the 18th and 19th centuries, by the turn of the 20th century they had transitioned to being permanent garrisons. They were further entrenched as such, via the military reforms of 
Lord Kitchener in 1903, and the Cantonments Act of 1924.

There are sixty-two "notified cantonments" in India, occupying an area of 157,000 acres: twenty-five in Central Command, nineteen in Southern Command, thirteen in Western Command, four in Eastern Command, and one in Northern Command. Major cantonments and garrisons include the following:

Notified Cantonments

 Agra Cantonment, Uttar Pradesh, Central Command
 Ahmedabad Cantonment, Gujarat, Southern Command
 Ahmednagar Cantonment, Maharashtra, Southern Command
Varanasi Cantonment, Uttar Pradesh, Central Command
 Ajmer Cantonment, Rajasthan, Southern Command
 Allahabad Cantonment, Uttar Pradesh, Central Command
  Almora Cantonment, Uttarakhand, Central Command
 Ambala Cantonment, Haryana, Western Command
 Amritsar Cantonment, Punjab, Western Command
 Aurangabad Cantonment, Maharashtra, Southern Command
 Ayodhya Cantonment, Uttar Pradesh, Central Command
 Babina Cantonment, Jhansi, Uttar Pradesh, Southern Command
 Badamibagh Cantonment, Jammu and Kashmir, Northern Command
 Bakloh Cantonment, Chamba District, Himachal Pradesh, Western Command
 Bareilly Cantonment, Uttar Pradesh, Central Command
 Barrackpore, West Bengal, Eastern Command
 Belgaum Cantonment, Karnataka, Southern Command
 Bellary Cantonment, Karnataka, Southern Command
 Cannanore Cantonment, Kerala, Southern Command
 Chakrata Cantonment, Uttarakhand, Central Command
 Clement Town Cantonment, Uttarakhand, Central Command
 Dagshai Cantonment, Himachal Pradesh, Western Command
 Dalhousie Cantonment, Himachal Pradesh, Western Command
 Danapur Cantonment, Bihar, Central Command
 Dehradun Cantonment, Uttarakhand, Central Command
 Yol Cantonment, Himachal Pradesh, Western Command
 Dehu Road Cantonment, Maharashtra, Southern Command
 Delhi Cantonment, Delhi, Western Command
 Deolali Cantonment, Maharashtra, Southern Command
 Dum Dum Cantonment, West Bengal, Eastern Command
 Faizabad Cantonment, Uttar Pradesh, Central Command
 Faizabad New Cantonment, Uttar Pradesh, Central Command
 Fatehgarh Cantonment, Uttar Pradesh, Central Command
 Ferozepur Cantonment, Punjab, Western Command
Gopalpur Cantonment, Odisha, Central Command
 Jabalpur Cantonment, Madhya Pradesh, Central Command
 Jalandhar Cantonment, Punjab, Western Command
 Jalapahar, Darjeeling, West Bengal, Eastern Command
 Jammu Cantonment, Jammu and Kashmir, Western Command
 Jhansi Cantonment, Uttar Pradesh, Southern Command
 Jutogh Cantonment, Shimla, Himachal Pradesh, Western Command
 Kamptee Cantonment, Maharashtra, Southern Command
 Kanpur Cantonment, Uttar Pradesh, Central Command
 Kasauli Cantonment, Himachal Pradesh, Western Command
 Khas Yol Cantonment, Kangara, Himachal Pradesh, Western Command
 Kirkee Cantonment, Maharashtra, Southern Command
 Landour Cantonment, Uttarakhand, Central Command
 Lansdowne Cantonment, Uttarakhand, Central Command
 Lebong, Darjeeling, West Bengal, Eastern Command
 Lucknow Cantonment, Uttar Pradesh, Central Command
 Mathura Cantonment, Uttar Pradesh, Central Command
 Meerut Cantonment, Uttar Pradesh, Central Command
 Mhow Cantonment, Madhya Pradesh, Central Command
 Morar Cantonment, Gwalior, Madhya Pradesh, Southern Command
 Nainital Cantonment, Uttarakhand, Central Command
 Nasirabad Cantonment, Rajasthan, Southern Command
 Pachmarhi Cantonment, Madhya Pradesh, Central Command
 Pune Cantonment, Maharashtra, Southern Command
 Ramgarh Cantonment, Jharkhand, Central Command
 Ranikhet Cantonment, Uttarakhand, Central Command
 Roorkee Cantonment, Uttarakhand, Central Command
 Saugor Cantonment, Madhya Pradesh, Southern Command
 Secunderabad Cantonment, Telangana, Southern Command
 Shahajahanpur Cantonment, Uttar Pradesh, Central Command
 Shillong Cantonment, Meghalaya, Eastern Command
 St. Thomas Mount Cantonment, Chennai, Tamil Nadu, Southern Command
 Subathu Cantonment, Shimla Hills, Himachal Pradesh, Western Command
 Wellington Cantonment, Tamil Nadu, Southern Command

Unlisted Military Cantonments

Abohar Cantonment (Abohar, Punjab)
Varanasi Cantonment, Uttar Pradesh, Central Command
Akhnoor Cantonment (Akhnoor, Jammu and Kashmir)
Baddowal Cantonment (Ludhiana, Punjab)
Bangalore Cantonment (Bangalore, Karnataka)
Bikaner Cantonment (Bikaner, Rajasthan)
Bhatinda Cantonment (Bhatinda, Punjab)
Bhuj Cantonment (Bhuj, Gujarat)
Bhopal Cantonment (Madhya Pradesh)
Chandimandir Cantonment (Chandigarh)
Faridkot Cantonment (Faridkot, Punjab)
Fazilka Cantonment (Fazilka, Punjab)
Gandhinagar Cantonment (Gandhinagar, Gujarat)
Gopalpur Cantonment (Brahmapur, Orissa)
Narengi Cantonment (Guwahati, Assam)
Hisar Cantt (Hisar, Haryana)
Itarana Cantonment (Alwar, Rajasthan)
Jaipur Cantonment (Jaipur, Rajasthan)
Jaisalmer Cantonment (Jaisalmer, Rajasthan)
Jodhpur Cantonment (Rajasthan)
Bharatpur Cantonment (Rajasthan)
Joshimath Cantonment (Joshimath, Uttarakhand)
Kapurthala Cantonment (Kapurthala, Punjab)
Khasa Cantonment (Amritsar, Punjab)
Kollam Cantonment (Kollam, India)
Ludhiana Cantonment (Punjab)
Mamun Cantonment (Pathankot, Punjab)
Missamari Cantonment (Missamari, Assam)
Nagrota Cantonment (Nagrota, Jammu & Kashmir)
Pathankot Cantonment (Pathankot, Punjab)
Patiala Cantonment (Punjab)
Pithoragarh Cantonment (Pithoragarh , Uttarakhand)
Dipatoli Cantonment (Ranchi, Jharkhand)
Shahjahanpur Cantonment (Shahjahanpur, Uttar Pradesh)
Solmara Cantonment (Tezpur, Assam)
Sri Ganganagar Cantonment (Sri Ganganagar, Rajasthan)
Suratgarh Cantonment (Suratgarh, Rajasthan)
Thiruvananthapuram Cantonment (Thiruvananthapuram, Kerala)
Tibri Cantonment (Hoshiarpur, Punjab)
Udhampur Cantonment (Udhampur, Jammu & Kashmir)
Vadodra Cantonment (Vadodra, Gujarat)
Binnaguri Cantonment(West Bengal)
Siliguri Cantonment(West Bengal)
Shillong Cantonment(Meghalaya)
Beas Military Station(Punjab)

Ghana 
Babina cantonments*Cantonments, Accra

Nigeria 
Cantonments in Nigeria refer to permanent military installations which house active personnel and their families. Cantonments in Nigeria include:
Airforce Cantonment, Ikeja, Lagos
Armed forces resettlement centre, Oshodi, Lagos
Army Ordnance Cantonment, (also known as Abalti Barracks), Yaba, Lagos
Arn Cantonment, Yaba, Lagos
Badagry Cantonment, Badagry, Lagos
Dodan Cantonment, Ikoyi, Lagos
Ikeja Cantonment, Ikeja, Lagos
Marda Cantonment, Yaba, Lagos
Navy Town, Ojo, Lagos
Ojo Cantonment (also known as Palm Barracks), Ojo, Lagos,
Bonny Camp, Victoria Island
 Jaji military cantonment, kaduna,
Dalet cantonment, kaduna,
Mogadishu cantonment,
Abiyssinia cantonment,
.Burma cantonment,
Adshanti cantonment,
Nigerian Defence Academy, Afaka, Kaduna

Pakistan

Abbottabad Cantonment
Attock Cantonment
Allama Iqbal Cantonment
Bannu Cantonment
Bhawalpur Cantonment
Chaklala Cantonment
Clifton Cantonment, Karachi
Dera Ismail Khan Cantonment
Faisal Cantonment, Karachi
Faisalabad Cantonment
Gujranwala Cantonment
Hyderabad Cantonment
Jhelum Cantonment
Kamra Cantonment
Karachi Cantonment
Kharian Cantonment
Khuzdar Cantonment
Korangi Creek Cantonment, Karachi
Lahore Cantonment
Walton Cantonment: Created out of the southern parts of the original Lahore Cantt., Walton, Lahore
Loralai Cantonment
Malir Cantonment, Karachi
Mangla Cantonment
Manora Cantonment, Karachi
Mardan Cantonment
Multan Cantonment
Murree Cantonment
Nowshera Cantonment
Okara Cantonment
Ormara Cantonment
Pano Aqil Cantonment
Peshawar Cantonment
Quetta Cantonment
Rawalpindi Cantonment
Sanjwal Cantonment
Sargodha Cantonment
Shorkot Cantonment (PAF Rafiqui)
Sialkot Cantonment
Taxila Cantonment
Wah Cantonment
Zhob Cantonment

Singapore
In Singapore, the term is used to denote a police cantonment.

South Africa 

 Thaba Tshwane

Sri Lanka
Panagoda Cantonment

United States
The United States military commonly uses the term "cantonment" to describe the permanent facilities at U.S. Army training bases as opposed to the field training areas. Cantonment areas often include housing (such as barracks and maid-service quarters), dining facilities, training classrooms, exchanges, and paved air fields.

See also 
 Kaserne

References

External links

 Cantonment Boards in India

 
Indian English idioms
Military installations of India
Barracks